Netrin-1 is a protein that in humans is encoded by the NTN1 gene.

Netrin is included in a family of laminin-related secreted proteins.  The function of this gene has not yet been defined; however, netrin is thought to be involved in axon guidance and cell migration during development.  Mutations and loss of expression of netrin suggest that variation in netrin may be involved in cancer development.

Interactions
NTN1 has been shown to interact with Deleted in Colorectal Cancer.

References

Further reading

</ref>

Varadarajan, Supraja G., et al. "Netrin1 produced by neural progenitors, not floor plate cells, is required for axon guidance in the spinal cord." Neuron 94.4 (2017): 790-799.
https://doi.org/10.1016/j.neuron.2017.03.007

External links 
 
 

Netrins